The National Evangelical Christian Fellowship (NECF) is a national evangelical alliance, member of the World Evangelical Alliance.

History 
It was formed in 1983 when divisions, dissipation of meagre resources and the lack of a credible, united evangelical voice became acutely noticed when certain constraints developed in the country. These constraints included the partial banning of Malay translation of the Bible, the limiting of the number of sites for worship which affected the status of independent churches and the outlawing of public gatherings of five or more people.

Member churches
 Assembly of God
 Malaysia Baptist Convention
 Christian Brethren of Malaysia
 Evangelical Free Church
 Full Gospel Assembly
 Full Gospel Tabernacle
 Hope of God Church
 Independent Churches
 Latter Rain Church
 Salvation Army
 Sidang Injil Borneo Sabah
 Sidang Injil Borneo Sarawak
 Sidang Injil Borneo Semenanjung
 Bible Seminaries
 Parachurches
 Others - Individual Churches from Mainline Denominations: Methodist, Presbyterian, etc.

External links
 

Protestantism in Malaysia
Christian organizations established in 1983
National evangelical alliances